Glenn Wesley Turner (1934–2020), was a salesman best known for his Orlando, Florida based  multi-level marketing cosmetic company  Koscot Interplanetary, Inc.   Turner and Koscot became entangled in numerous legal difficulties and Koscot went out of business in the 1970s. In 1987 Turner was  convicted on charges of conspiracy, fraud and operating a pyramid scheme, and sentenced  to seven years in prison.

Early life
According to newspaper reports, Turner was a  son of a South Carolina sharecropper and an unwed mother. He was born with a cleft palate and a hare lip; surgery to correct them left a scar for which he was bullied until he dropped out of school in the eighth grade. He served briefly in the U.S. Air Force before successfully graduating from a school for those who had dropped out of high school.

Multi-level marketing success
Turner started out selling sewing machines, and also worked briefly for Holiday Magic -- a multi-level marketing company that sold home-care products and cosmetics, and through related companies sold self-improvement programs. In the late 1960s he became an entrepreneur, founding Glenn W. Turner Enterprises, Inc.  By 1972 he owned an estimated  70 companies, including  Dare to Be Great, a multi-level marketing company founded in 1969 which sold motivational and self-improvement courses. 

What reportedly made Turner "really rich", however, was Koscot Interplanetary Inc. (Koscot stood for "Kosmetics for the Communities of Tomorrow"), founded on August 27, 1967. Koscot and Dare to be Great grew rapidly and Turner became famous. At one point 60,000 people in 40 states and Canada worked for his businesses.  By the spring of 1969, Turner was living in a large home on Lake Maitland near Orlando Florida, and "had eight Cadillacs and a Rolls-Royce, three Learjets and a closetful of tailor-made suits and alligator shoes". (In 1972 he started but didn't finish a "$3.5 million white stone castle with a helicopter landing pad" on  Bear Gulley Lake, also near Orlando.)
He was featured in an 11-page article in Life magazine in 1971, and was reportedly worth $300 million at the time.

The premise of Koscot was that participants could sell mink oil-based cosmetics door-to-door or at parties. However, the focus of the company was more about selling distributorships than cosmetics.  Participants could pay $2,000 to be a supervisor or $5,400 to be a director.  These levels (as in "multi-level marketing") would in theory make money by recruiting other participants to work as salespeople, supervisors or directors, at lower levels,  paying commissions  from orders of cosmetics to those at higher levels who recruited them. They would then recruit their own participants to earn commissions for them. As one news story put it: 

He warned his would-be millionaires that nefarious elites conspired against their success, telling a Houston Koscot meeting in January 1970:

Turner's "rags to riches" story was to be an inspiration for others to buy franchises so that "they could all be rich and successful like him". To form the pyramids of success, many directors, larger numbers of supervisors, salespeople and still more customers were needed. 

When some salespeople found customers in short supply, Turner encouraged them to “'fake it until you make it,' by wearing expensive clothes and waving around $100 bills to lure in others".

Legal difficulties
Pyramid schemes being illegal in most states , Koscot became involved in substantial litigation from government agencies and Koscot's customers. The first major lawsuit was filed in October 1969, by "14 Koscot distributors in Tennessee, Kentucky and Indiana" over Turner's  failure "to pay promised dividends."

According to one report, he was the target of prosecutors "in more than 30 states". Disillusioned recruits testified against Turner or his companies, and one judge cited the phrase  'fake it until you make it', as "evidence of malfeasance". In 1971, the Federal Trade Commission filed a lawsuit against Koscot, charging restraint of trade. In August 1972, he was charged with "86 counts of sale of unregistered securities and failing to register as a dealer". 

The Securities and Exchange Commission also filed a lawsuit in 1972 charging that Koscot's program should be considered a security and comply with securities laws and regulations.  The FTC's decision on Koscot set a precedent for defining if a company is engaging in illegal pyramiding.

In 1973, a federal judge in Pittsburgh combined more than 1,000 lawsuits by unhappy Koscot investors and regulatory officials into "a single class-action lawsuit seeking more than $900 million." Turner, attorney F. Lee Bailey, and eight others were also indicted by a federal grand jury on conspiracy and mail fraud charges.  The indictment said that Bailey had appeared in a film made for Turner's organization and had appeared with Turner at several rallies.  A nine-month trial ended in a hung jury.  Charges were then dropped against Bailey.  In 1975, Turner pleaded guilty to a single charge of violating securities laws and was given probation, avoiding prison but financially beaten, "his empire in ruins.  After Koscot was sold in bankruptcy, the new owner found that it "had generated $169 million, still had assets of $11 million, but owed $33 million." 

Turner ran in the Democratic primary for the United States Senate election in Florida, 1974, but lost.  He also lost running for state senate in 1978.

In 1979, his fortune gone, he attempted a comeback with another motivational company called Challenge, Inc., which led to more legal difficulties.  According to one report he was convicted of running a pyramid scheme in Arizona in 1985 and released after five years in prison. Another reported him  sentenced  to seven years in prison in 1987, after being convicted  along with Edward Rector, on charges of conspiracy, fraud and operating a pyramid scheme. He told reporters as he was led away to jail: “The good that I have done outweighs the bad. A technicality of the law is what got me.”

Legacy
Turner died in his home in Lake Mary, Florida, in 2020. Columnist Helaine Olen noted that despite having   been  "all but omnipresent in American life", at the peak of his success, his death met with almost no media or public attention. 
Roger Roy writes that of the "untold number" of former Koscot and Dare to be Great believers, "most seem anxious to forget the Koscot heydays, and some seem embarrassed by their association with Turner".

Also commenting on his conspicuously quiet passing, Jim Ridolphi tells of friends who spent their weekends "traveling the backroads of the Carolinas in a high energy house party" selling Turner's Challenge product. 

But while Turner's name is not well remembered, his  technique, Olen argues,  has had great influence on American culture. His slogan  “fake it until you make it”, came to  express "the scrappy, optimistic mind-set of American hustle culture". But Turner and the 21st century figures like Elizabeth Holmes,  Sam Bankman-Fried, and George Santos demonstrate that  it can be easy to fake it, but much more difficult to make it.

References

SEC v. Koscot Interplanetary, 497 F.2d 473 (1974)
In Re Koscot Interplanetary Inc., 86 F.T.C. 11106 (1975)

Further reading
Robinson, Kenneth Michael. The Great American Mail-Fraud Trial.  Nash Publications. 1976.  (Kenneth Michael Robinson was the defense attorney for Koscot)
Maxa, Rudy. Dare to Be Great: The Unauthorized Story of Glenn Turner. Morrow. 1977  (Rudy Maxa was an investigative journalist for the Washington Post)
Frasca, John. Con Man or Saint?. Droke House. 1969.
Frasca, John. The Unstoppable Glenn Turner. Pyramid Publications. 1972.
Frasca, John. GWT Changed the World for Me: The Story of Glenn W. Turner - Motivational Genius. Pyramid Publications. 1972 (John Frasca was a Pulitzer Prize-winning former investigative journalist at the Tampa Tribune, who became Glenn Turner's publicist)
</ref>

Defunct multi-level marketing companies
Fraud in the United States
Large-group awareness training
Pyramid and Ponzi schemes